The Ferrari 250 GT SWB Breadvan is a one-off Ferrari made in 1962 from a 1961 Ferrari 250 GT Berlinetta SWB, chassis number 2819 GT.  It was built to compete against the new 1962 Ferrari 250 GTO at the 24 Hours of Le Mans and other FIA World Sportscar Championship races.

Development

In 1962, the engineer Giotto Bizzarrini was hired by Count Giovanni Volpi, owner of the Scuderia Serenissima racing team, to upgrade a Ferrari 250 GT SWB so it would be competitive with the then-new Ferrari 250 GTO. Enzo Ferrari had refused to sell any GTOs to Count Volpi, due to Volpi's hiring of former Ferrari employees at ATS.

The donor car for this project was a 250 GT SWB Competition, serial number 2819 GT. This car had previously competed in the 1961 Tour de France, where it took 2nd place overall driven by Olivier Gendebien and Lucien Bianchi. The car was sold by Gendebien to Volpi shortly afterward for use with Scuderia Serenissima. As with other competition-spec SWBs, this car had a lightweight body and chassis, minimal trim, and a more powerful 286 bhp Tipo 168 engine with Testarossa-type heads.

Bizzarrini applied all the ideas he had developed working on the GTO and together with the car body specialist Piero Drogo developed an aerodynamically advanced body, even lower than the GTO's, with the roof line dramatically extended to the rear end following Kamm aerodynamic theory. The resulting shooting-brake appearance led to the French press nicknaming it "La Camionnette" (little truck), while the English-speaking journalists called it the "Breadvan."

Bizzarrini moved the engine and radiator further back to the center of the chassis than the GTO, and lowered it by fitting a dry sump system. The original three 46 DCN Weber carburetors were replaced with six twin choke 38 DCN Webers. The original 4-speed gearbox was retained. Giorgio Neri and Luciano Bonacini of Modena were contracted to perform all the mechanical modifications and race preparation.

Competition history
The rebodied Breadvan made its competition debut at the 1962 24 Hours of Le Mans. It quickly passed all Ferrari GTOs and was 7th overall during the 4th hour when a driveshaft failure caused its retirement. Results at other races proved the design's effectiveness, as the car won the GT class in two races during the 1962 season. The car's last race in period was at the Coppa Gallenga Hillclimb in 1965, however since 1973 it has appeared regularly at historic races worldwide, including events such as the Monterey Historic Automobile Races, the Goodwood Festival of Speed and the Tour Auto.

Influence
The 250 GT SWB Breadvan's unusual but effective aerodynamics proved the Kamm tail design that would be used on many other racing cars, including the Ford J-car and the Alfa Romeo Giulia TZ.

Following the success of the Breadvan, two additional 250 GT SWB cars (S/N 2053 GT and 2735 GT) were modified for privateer drivers by Bizzarrini, Drogo, Neri and Bonacini, distinctively bodied with similar shapes. A third modified Ferrari was planned but not completed. An Iso Rivolta, chassis number IR460368, was also rebodied by Drogo in a similar style to 2819 GT.

Similar shooting brake designs were used on later Ferrari concept cars and production cars such as the 456 GT Venice and the Ferrari FF.

In 2018, Niels van Roij, car designer and coachbuilder, was commissioned to create an homage vehicle. A Ferrari 550 Maranello was the base vehicle. The design and realisation of the vehicle was documented and regularly released for public viewing by van Roij.

See also
Maserati Tipo 154, A similar design by Drogo

References

Further reading

External links
Supercars.net article on the Ferrari 250 GT "Breadvan"
Coachbuild.com encyclopedia: Ferrari 250 GT "Breadvan"

250 GT SWB Breadvan
24 Hours of Le Mans race cars
1960s cars
One-off cars
Rear-wheel-drive vehicles
Station wagons